Artem Sytnyk (born 1979 in Kirovohrad Oblast) is the head of the National Anti-Corruption Bureau of Ukraine.

In December 2018, a court ruled that Sytnik illegally released information about alleged illegal payments to Paul Manafort, however, that decision was annulled by an appeals court in July 2019.

In May 2019, the State Bureau of Investigation started criminal proceedings into the accusation that Sytnyk had several free vacations at a luxury hunting estate in Rivne Oblast, with friend and businessman Mykola Nadeyko paying the bill for hotel accommodation, food and expensive entertainment. The court of first instance found Sytnyk guilty of corruption and sentenced him to a fine of UAH 3,400 (US$144 in 2019). In December 2019, the court of appeals in Rivne upheld the guilty ruling and sentence. The law on NABU states that a "final and binding conviction" is a reason for dismissal from the post of NABU director.

A draft resolution on the dismissal of Sytnik as the head of the National Anti-Corruption Bureau  was registered in Ukraine's parliament on 7 February 2020. On 28 August 2020 a Constitutional Court of Ukraine ruling concluded that (former) President Petro Poroshenko had exceeded his powers when appointing Sytnyk as head of the National Anti-Corruption Bureau in his 16 April 2015 decree. The ruling did state that it did not change "legal relations that have arisen as a result of the performance of official duties  by the person appointed by the above-mentioned decree."

References

21st-century Ukrainian lawyers
Ukrainian government officials
Yaroslav Mudryi National Law University alumni
People from Kirovohrad Oblast
Living people
1979 births